Matlow is a surname. Notable people with the surname include:
Josh Matlow (born 1975), Canadian politician
Jeff Matlow, American founder of Crank! Records
Swizzels Matlow, English confectioner established by Maurice and Alfred Matlow

See also
Matelot (disambiguation)